Kappa V is an important archaeological site in the southern part of the U.S. state of Indiana.  Its importance qualified it for addition to the National Register of Historic Places in 1986, one week before the nearby sites known as Axsom Branch, Epsilon II, and Refuge #7.

References

Archaeological sites on the National Register of Historic Places in Indiana
Archaic period in North America
Geography of Monroe County, Indiana
National Register of Historic Places in Monroe County, Indiana
Woodland period